Crosstalk: The Best of Moby Grape is a 2004 compilation album by Moby Grape, released by Sony International.  It was released at a time when the legal status of ownership of Moby Grape recordings was uncertain.

Track listing 

"Hey Grandma" (Miller, Stevenson) – 2:45
"Fall on You"  (Lewis) – 1:55
"8.05" (Miller, Stevenson) – 2:21
"Come in the Morning" (Mosley) – 2:17
"Omaha" (Spence) – 2:45
"Rounder" [instrumental] (Spence) – 2:03
"Changes" (Miller, Stevenson) – 3:24
"Murder in My Heart for the Judge" (Miller, Stevenson) – 2:59
"Bitter Wind" (Mosley) – 3:07
"Can't Be So Bad"  Miller, Stevenson – 3:26
"He" (Lewis) – 3:37
"Motorcycle Irene" (Spence) – 2:26
"Ooh Mama Ooh" (Miller, Stevenson) – 2:28
"Ain't That a Shame" (Lewis, Miller, Stephenson) – 2:30
"Captain Nemo" (Miller, Stevenson) – 1:46
"What's to Choose" (Lewis) – 1:57
"Going Nowhere" (Miller, Stevenson) – 2:04
"I Am Not Willing" (Lewis) – 3:00
"It's a Beautiful Day Today" (Mosley) – 3:07
"Right Before My Eyes" (Lewis) – 2:05
"Changes, Circles, Spinning" [Album Version] (Lewis) – 2:27
"Truly Fine Citizen" (Tim Dell'Ara) – 1:49
"Looper" [Album Version] (Lewis) – 3:02
"Hoochie" (Mosley) – 4:24

Personnel 
 Peter Lewis – rhythm guitar, vocals
 Jerry Miller – lead guitar, vocals
 Bob Mosley - bass, vocals
 Skip Spence – rhythm guitar, vocals
 Don Stevenson – drums, vocals

2004 greatest hits albums
Moby Grape albums
Psychedelic rock compilation albums